Jongno-dong is a dong, neighbourhood of Jongno-gu in Seoul, South Korea.

References

External links
 Jongno-1.2.3.4 ga-dong
 Jongno-5.6 ga-dong

Neighbourhoods of Jongno-gu